Ri Hyon-ok (born January 13, 1970, in Pyongyang) is a North Korean sport shooter. She won a bronze medal in skeet shooting at the 2007 Asian Shooting Championships in Kuwait City, Kuwait, and finished seventh at the 2004 Summer Olympics.

Ri qualified as the only female athlete for the North Korean shooting squad in the women's skeet at the 2004 Summer Olympics in Athens, by having registered a minimum qualifying score of 66 and obtaining a top four finish from the Asian Championships in Kuala Lumpur, Malaysia. Ri aggregated a total record of 68 out of 75 targets in the qualifying stage, but fell abruptly in a two-way shoot-off against U.S. shooter Kimberly Rhode by 2 to 1, leaving her in seventh out of twelve prospective shooters.

References

External links
ISSF Profile

1970 births
Living people
North Korean female sport shooters
Olympic shooters of North Korea
Shooters at the 2004 Summer Olympics
Sportspeople from Pyongyang
Asian Games medalists in shooting
Asian Games silver medalists for North Korea
Shooters at the 1990 Asian Games
Medalists at the 1990 Asian Games
20th-century North Korean women
21st-century North Korean women